If I Should Go Before You is the fifth studio album by City and Colour. It was released on October 9, 2015, through Dine Alone Records. The release was City and Colour's third consecutive studio album to reach No. 1 on the Canadian Albums Chart.

Reception
The album received very positive reviews upon release, with some believing it may be Green's best album to date. The album also did well commercially, becoming the band's first number one album on the Canadian iTunes Store. The album was nominated for several Juno Awards, including an Artist of the Year nomination for Green, as well as nominations for the songwriting on "Blood", "Lover Come Back", and "Wasted Love".

Track listing

Personnel
Dallas Green – vocals, guitar, producer, congas on "Northern Blues"
Dante Schwebel – guitar
Doug MacGregor – drums, percussion
Jack Lawrence – bass guitar
Matt Kelly – pedal steel, keys, trumpet

Charts

References

2015 albums
City and Colour albums
Dine Alone Records albums